The 1982 New York Cosmos season was the 12th season for the New York Cosmos in the now-defunct North American Soccer League. The Cosmos completed their fourth double—a feat not matched by any NASL or, as yet, MLS club—finishing 37 points ahead of Seattle for the league premiership, and defeating the Sounders in Soccer Bowl '82 for the league championship.

Squad 

Source:

Results 
Source:

Friendlies 
Source:

Transatlantic Challenge Cup 
Source:

Spring Cup 
Source:

Regular season 
Pld = Games Played, W = Wins, L = Losses, GF = Goals For, GA = Goals Against, Pts = Points
6 points for a win, 1 point for a shootout win, 0 points for a loss, 1 point for each goal scored (up to three per game).

Eastern Division Standings

Overall league placing 

Source:

Matches 

April 10, 1982: New York Cosmos 3, Jacksonville Tea Men 2 Jacksonville, Fl Attendance: 4,537

April 18, 1982, New York Cosmos 2, Tampa Bay Rowdies 0 Giants Stadium Attendance 52,436

April 24, 1982: New York Cosmos 3, Chicago Sting 1 Wrigley Field Attendance 16,149

April 28, 1982: Fort Lauderdale Strikers 2, New York Cosmos 1 Lockhart Stadium Attendance 17,951

May 2, 1982: New York Cosmos 2, Jacksonville Tea Men 0 Giants Stadium Attendance 32,710

May 5, 1982: New York Cosmos 1, Toronto Blizzard 2 Varsity Stadium Attendance 16,746

May 8, 1982: New York Cosmos 3, Tulsa Roughnecks 2 Skelly Stadium Attendance 21,118

May 12, 1982: New York Cosmos 2, San Diego Sockers 1 San Diego Sports Arena 14,805

May 16, 1982: Chicago Sting 1, New York Cosmos 3 Giants Stadium 36,193

May 19, 1982: New York Cosmos 3, Portland Timbers 2 Civic Stadium 15,233

May 23, 1982: New York Cosmos 3, Fort Lauderdale Strikers 2 Giants Stadium 18,710

June 6, 1982: New York Cosmos 2, Toronto Blizzard 1 Giants Stadium 18,938

June 12, 1982: New York Cosmos 2, Tampa Bay Rowdies 0 Tampa Stadium 28,475

June 18. 1982: Montreal Manic 3, New York Cosmos 2 Olympic Stadium 32,654

June 20, 1982: New York Cosmos 3, Seattle Sounders 2 Giants Stadium 27,397

June 23, 1982: New York Cosmos 3, Vancouver Whitecaps 2 Giants Stadium 22,914

June 27, 1982: New York Cosmos 3, Edmonton Drillers 1 Giants Stadium 26,379

June 30, 1982: San Jose Earthquakes 4, New York Cosmos 2 Spartan Stadium 18,111

July 3, 1982: Vancouver Whitecaps 1, New York Cosmos 0 Empire Stadium 22,618

July 7, 1982: Edmonton Drillers 2, New York Cosmos 1 Clarke Stadium 8,697

July 10, 1982: New York Cosmos 2, Chicago Sting 1 Wrigley Field 18,023

July 14, 1982: New York Cosmos 3, Montreal Manic 2 Giants Stadium 25,634

July 18, 1982: New York Cosmos 6, Portland Timbers 2 Giants Stadium 24,387

July 22, 1982: New York Cosmos 1, Toronto Blizzard 0 Varsity Stadium 10,856

July 25, 1982: New York Cosmos 2, San Diego Sockers 1 Giants Stadium 29,572

July 28, 1982: New York Cosmos 2, San Jose Earthquakes 1 Giants Stadium 18,828

August 1, 1982: New York Cosmos 3, Montreal Manic 2 Giants Stadium 38,891

August 4, 1982: Seattle Sounders 3, New York Cosmos 2 Kingdome attendance 23,925

August 11, 1982: Toronto Blizzard 4, New York Cosmos 1 Giants Stadium Attendance 22,158

August 15, 1982: New York Cosmos 3, Chicago Sting 1 Giants Stadium Attendance 36,241

August 18, 1982: New York Cosmos 3, Tulsa Roughnecks 1 Giants Stadium Attendance 28,638

August 20, 1982: Montreal Manic 3, New York Cosmos 1 Olympic Stadium 34,251

Postseason

Overview

Quarter-finals

Semi-finals

Soccer Bowl '82

See also
1982 North American Soccer League season
List of New York Cosmos seasons

References

New York
New York Cosmos seasons
New York
New York Cosmos
Soccer Bowl champion seasons